The following is a list of units transferred to the Territorial Force on 1 April 1908, or raised in that year under the terms of the Territorial and Reserve Forces Act 1907, and the associations by which they were administered. The County Association of Rutland did not have charge of any units, but did provide facilities for sub-units of the Leicestershire Yeomanry and the 5th Battalion Leicestershire Regiment. A number of units, particularly those attached to the Royal Garrison Artillery and Royal Engineers, had their titles altered again in 1910.

Yeomanry

Yeomanry regiments formed the cavalry arm of the TF, and were grouped into mounted brigades of three regiments each.

Royal Horse Artillery
Royal Horse Artillery units formed artillery support to the mounted brigades. Most of the batteries were newly raised in 1908.

†The HAC had its property and privileges protected by the Honourable Artillery Company Act 1908.††On 18 March 1908, Wiltshire RHA was proposed to be raised as a new unit. However, poor recruiting led to a change in plans and the Hampshire RHA was raised in 1909 instead.

Royal Field Artillery
Royal Field Artillery brigades formed parts of each territorial division, and were mobile and equipped with medium calibre ordnance.

Royal Garrison Artillery
Royal Garrison Artillery units of the TF were "defended ports" units guarding coastal facilities, with the exception of the 4th Highland Brigade, which was equipped as mountain artillery.

Royal Engineers

Each division of the TF was supported by two field companies and a telegraph company of the Royal Engineers. In addition there were a number of fortress units consisting of works and electric lights companies, providing coastal defence.

Infantry and cyclist battalions

† Formed from part of the former 1st VB. When the battalion was converted to artillery in 1908, a number of officers had refused to transfer, and were placed on the unattached list. They became the basis for the 6th Battalion in 1912.

Army Service Corps
Each infantry division had an attached Divisional Transport and Supply Column of the ASC. A column consisted of four companies: a headquarters company and one attached to each of the three infantry brigades that made up the division. A smaller transport and supply column, consisting of a single company, was attached to each mounted brigade. While some of the ASC companies were formed by the conversion of existing infantry or artillery units of the volunteer force, most were newly raised in 1908.

Mounted Brigade Companies

References

Bibliography
 Norman E.H. Litchfield, The Territorial Artillery 1908–1988 (Their Lineage, Uniforms and Badges), Nottingham: Sherwood Press, 1992, .
 Norman Litchfield & Ray Westlake, The Volunteer Artillery 1859–1908 (Their Lineage, Uniforms and Badges), Nottingham: Sherwood Press, 1982, .
 Cliff Lord & Graham Watson, Royal Corps of Signals: Unit Histories of the Corps (1920–2001) and its Antecedents, Solihull: Helion, 2003, .
 
 R.A. Westlake, Royal Engineers (Volunteers) 1859–1908, Wembley: R.A. Westlake, 1983, .

Territorial Force (1908)

1908 in military history
1908 in the United Kingdom
20th-century history of the British Army